Armando González was a Paraguayan football midfielder who played for Paraguay in the 1950 FIFA World Cup. He also played for Club Guaraní. González is deceased.

References

External links
FIFA profile

Year of birth missing
Year of death missing
Paraguayan footballers
Paraguay international footballers
Association football midfielders
Club Guaraní players
1950 FIFA World Cup players